Nyaung-U is a district of the Mandalay Division in central Burma.

Townships
The district contains the following townships:

Nyaung-U Township
Kyaukpadaung Township

Districts of Myanmar
Mandalay Region